Abyssorhynchia is an extant brachiopod genus found in the Pacific Ocean.

References

External links 
 

Rhynchonellida